Rafael Furlan Soares (born 20 September 1994), known as Rafael Furlan, is a Brazilian football plays as defender for Patrocinense-MG

Club career
He made his Primeira Liga debut for Chaves on 14 August 2017 in a game against Benfica.

References

External links
 
 

1994 births
Sportspeople from Goiás
Living people
Brazilian footballers
Brazilian expatriate footballers
Joinville Esporte Clube players
Clube Atlético Metropolitano players
Anápolis Futebol Clube players
Grêmio Esportivo Anápolis players
G.D. Chaves players
G.D. Estoril Praia players
S.C. Farense players
U.D. Vilafranquense players
Campeonato Brasileiro Série B players
Liga Portugal 2 players
Primeira Liga players
Association football defenders
Expatriate footballers in Portugal
Brazilian expatriate sportspeople in Portugal